Eternal Winter is a 2018 Hungarian drama film directed by Attila Szász. Marina Gera won the International Emmy Award for best actress for her performance as Irén.

Cast
Marina Gera - Irén
Sándor Csányi - Rajmund
Laura Döbrösi - Anna
 - Éva

References

External links
 

Hungarian drama films
2018 drama films